Charles L. Owens (April 13, 1930 – May 24, 2016) was the first African-American judge in Oklahoma. He was appointed by Governor Dewey F. Bartlett in 1968.

Background 
Owens was born in Tulsa, Oklahoma and graduated from Booker T. Washington High School in 1948. He graduated from Lincoln University in Jefferson City, MO in 1952 with a degree in business administration.  He served with the Signal Corps in Germany and France from 1952-1954. He later worked for the Tulsa Police Department while attending law school at the University of Tulsa, where he graduated in 1960. He was admitted to the Oklahoma Bar Association in 1960 and formed a partnership with Edward Lawrence Goodwin, publisher of the Oklahoma Eagle. He was appointed as the first African-American assistant attorney general in Oklahoma in 1963 by Charles R. Nesbitt. Owens argued a U.S. Supreme Court Case in 1968, which was the first criminal case from Oklahoma which the Supreme Court granted a full hearing.

See also
List of African-American jurists

References 

1930 births
2016 deaths
Lincoln University (Missouri) alumni
African-American judges
University of Tulsa College of Law alumni
20th-century American judges
20th-century African-American people
21st-century African-American people